Mornings @ GMA is a Philippine television news broadcasting and talk show broadcast by GMA Network. It premiered on April 13, 1998 replacing GMA Balita and Good Morning Asia. The show concluded on December 3, 1999. It was replaced by Unang Hirit in its timeslot.

It was nominated for four awards including Best Morning Show Nomination in the 1999 PMPC Star Awards for Television.

Hosts

 Mon Isberto
 Tisha Silang
 Cher Calvin
 Paolo Bediones
 Ryan Agoncillo
 Suzie Entrata
 Lyn Ching
 Arnold Clavio
 Karen Davila
 Kara David
 Georgette Tengco
 Oscar Oida

References

1998 Philippine television series debuts
1999 Philippine television series endings
Breakfast television in the Philippines
English-language television shows
Filipino-language television shows
GMA Network news shows
GMA Integrated News and Public Affairs shows
Philippine television news shows